Mirela-Mădălina Nichita-Paşca (born 26 September 1985) is a Romanian female handballer who plays as a goalkeeper for Măgura Cisnădie.

International honours 
EHF Cup:
Finalist: 2012
Semifinalist: 2013

References

1985 births
Living people
People from Tulcea
Romanian female handball players